The 2022—2023 bombing of Lviv and the Lviv Oblast began after the 2022 Russian invasion of Ukraine. Lviv Oblast was attacked from March–November, and Lviv city from May–October. The targets were both civilian and military, including electricity and railway infrastructure and a military base. Seven civilians were killed.

Timeline

2022

February 
In the Lviv Oblast, enemy troops attacked three military units around 07:30 — in Brodi, Novi Kalinov and Kamianka-Buzka.

March 

On the morning of March 13, Russian troops from the Black and Azov Seas launched an air strike on the Yavoriv military range. The planes took off from Engels-2 air base [ru] in the Saratov Oblast. In total, they fired more than 30 missiles, 8 of which hit the Yavoriv military range. As a result, according to the Lviv OMA, 35 people died and 134 were injured.

On the morning of March 18, Russian forces fired six X-555 missiles at Lviv, aiming at the Lviv State Aircraft Repair Plant. Two missiles were intercepted and destroyed by Ukrainian air defense forces, the other four destroyed the plant building. One person was injured in the shelling.

At about 6 pm on March 26, Russian troops launched a missile strike on an oil depot in the Velyki Kryvchytsi area, and a total of three explosions were recorded. A fire broke out, but no residential areas or other facilities were damaged. According to the head of the Lviv Oblast State Administration Maksym Kozytskyi, according to preliminary data, 5 people were injured.

Subsequently, at 8 pm, another rocket attack was carried out on the Lviv Armored Plant, which resulted in "quite serious damage." Andrii Sadovyi said that windows were broken in one of the schools near the place of impact. No one was injured. Later it became known that 2 missiles were fired at each of the objects, but the command of the Air Force of the Armed Forces of Ukraine says about 6 missiles fired at Lviv.

This activity of Russian troops is connected with the speech of US President Joe Biden in neighboring Poland, which took place immediately after the missile strikes.

On March 28, the Air Defense Forces of Ukraine shot down three enemy missiles in the Zolochiv Raion.

April 
On April 5, fighter jets tried to fire on civilian infrastructure in the Lviv Oblast from Belarus, but air defense forces shot down two missiles in Radekhiv.

On the morning of April 16, the occupiers launched missile strikes on the Lviv Oblast from Su-35 planes that took off from Baranovichi airfield from the territory of Belarus. Units of the anti-aircraft missile forces of the Air Command "West" of the Air Force of the Armed Forces of Ukraine destroyed four cruise missiles.

On the morning of April 18, 2022, according to the West Air Command, there were four missile strikes in Lviv, including three strikes on military infrastructure, and one on tire fitting. As a result of the fire, there were fires, the objects were significantly damaged. According to the head of the Lviv OVA Maksym Kozytskyi, 7 people died and 11 people, including a child, were injured.

About 40 cars were damaged or destroyed in the tire assembly due to the rocket explosion.

At around 8:30 a.m., shots were fired at the traction substation of the "Krasne" railway station.

May 
On May 3, Lviv was shelled. Mayor Andrij Sadovi stated that at least 5 explosions were known, three electrical substations were damaged in the city, and interruptions in the supply of electricity and water began in the part of the city. 2 people were injured.

4 rockets hit a military infrastructure facility in the district of Jaworiv, 15 km from Poland. Air defense shot down 2 more missiles. The rockets were launched from the Black Sea, probably from submarines.

One of the biggest shelling of Lviv and the Oblast. Some of the missiles were shot down by anti-aircraft defenses. There was a coup in Javorovsko District.

June 
There was shelling of the railway infrastructure in the Strija district. Five people were injured.

Ukrainian air defense forces shot down a rocket over Zolochiv district, debris damaged a brick factory. Six people were injured.

In the Javorovsko District, the Russians launched a rocket attack on a military facility. Air defense managed to shoot down two cruise missiles, four hit the target. As a result of the rocket attack, four people were injured.

August 
Lviv Oblast Military Administration (OMA) reported the explosions in Radekhiv. Later, it became known that the target was a military unit in the Chervonohrad Raion, and the Air Force Command of the Armed Forces of Ukraine clarified that the anti-aircraft missile complex was hit by a Russian missile.

October 
On October 10, 15 rockets were launched in the Lviv Oblast, 7 of which were shot down by air defense forces. The remaining targets of the rockets were objects of the city's critical infrastructure, the Russian mass media reported that one of the targets of the attack was the Lviv CHP-1. Almost the entire city was left without electricity and water supply, and there was also a problem with mobile communication. By the morning of the next day, electricity was restored almost everywhere.

On October 11, 3 strikes were made on the energy infrastructure of Lviv, as a result of which 30% of the city, mostly in the Sykhivskyi and Frankivskyi Districts, remained without electricity. 1 person was injured.

On October 13, 6 rockets were fired over the territory of Lviv Oblast, 4 of which were shot down by air defense forces. The targets of the remaining 2 missiles were a military facility in the Zolochiv Raion.

On October 22, several Russian missiles were shot down over Lviv Oblast.

November 
A Shahed 136 kamikaze drone was shot down over Lviv Oblast.

Lviv Oblast was attacked by more than 10 Russian missiles, most of which were shot down by air defense forces. Those that remained hit 3 "objects of critical infrastructure". 80% of Lviv, as well as parts of the Yavoriv, Zolochiv and Chervonohrad Raions, remained without electricity and heating. There were interruptions with connection, mobile Internet and water supply. As a result of the shelling, one person was hospitalized with serious injuries.

On November 23, two missile strikes were recorded at an electrical substation in Lviv Oblast, a while after the air alert was announced on the entire territory of Ukraine. At 15:07, Lviv and the region was completely out of power. Yavoriv Raion and Chervonohrad Raion also remained without electricity. In Lviv, trams and trolleybuses temporarily stopped running. 70% of traffic lights in the city were out of order. Emergency power outages were applied throughout the region. In Lviv, no rocket strikes have been confirmed on the territory of the city. According to the information of the Governor of Lviv Oblast, Maksym Kozytskyy, a total of 5 rockets have been fired towards the Lviv region, 3 of which were successfully taken down by the air defence systems.

December 
On 29 December, the Russians launched six rockets towards the Lviv region, four of which were shot down by air defence forces. There were two hits on a power substation.

2023

January 
On 14 January, an energy infrastructure facility in Lviv region was hit, causing a fire. Air defence forces shot down one missile.

February 
On 10 February, another missile attack was launched against the Lviv region. Air defence forces shot down nine missiles over the region, but there were also hits. One missile hit an energy infrastructure facility, another fell near a bus stop in a village in Zolochiv raion without detonating. Another fell near a sanatorium in Lviv district. The blast wave smashed some of the windows in the building.

On 16 February, at night, three Russian missiles hit a non-energy infrastructure facility near Drohobych. The resulting fire was extinguished. A shop wall collapsed on a neighbouring street, and windows were smashed in a nearby gymnasium.

March 

On 9 March, during a missile strike on Ukrainian territory, one Russian missile fell on a residential area in the village of Velyka Vilshanytsia, Zolochiv raion. The resulting fire destroyed three residential buildings, three cars, a garage and several outbuildings. Five people were killed.

References

Airstrikes during the 2022 Russian invasion of Ukraine
Attacks on buildings and structures in 2022
February 2022 events in Ukraine
March 2022 events in Ukraine
April 2022 events in Ukraine
May 2022 events in Ukraine
June 2022 events in Ukraine
July 2022 events in Ukraine
August 2022 events in Ukraine
March 2022 crimes in Europe
April 2022 crimes in Europe
Airstrikes conducted by Russia
Attacks on buildings and structures in Ukraine
Russian war crimes in Ukraine
War crimes during the 2022 Russian invasion of Ukraine
2022 bombing